Para Amarte Mejor is the fourth studio album by the Colombian musician Andrés Cepeda the album was released in 2005 and has a 2007 re-issue with DVD.

Track listing

Awards
The 2007 reissue album was nominated for the following 2007 Latin Grammy Awards:
Best Male Pop Album.

References

2005 albums
2007 albums
Andrés Cepeda albums
Spanish-language albums